The 2011 Dartmouth Big Green football team represented Dartmouth College in the 2011 NCAA Division I FCS football season. The Big Green were led by head coach Buddy Teevens in his seventh straight year and 12th overall and played their home games at Memorial Field. They are a member of the Ivy League. They finished the season 5–5 overall and 4–3 in Ivy League play to tie for second place.

Schedule

References

Dartmouth
Dartmouth Big Green football seasons
Dartmouth Big Green football